James Bryce Bennett (28 May 1891 – 24 October 1955) was a Scottish amateur footballer who played as an outside forward in the Scottish League for Queen's Park.

Personal life 
Bennett's older brother Alec was also a footballer who won League championships with both Celtic and Rangers, and was a Scottish international. Their father Robert was a master draper and amateur poet of some local esteem whose portrait is on display in a Hamilton museum.

In November 1914, three months after Britain's entry into the First World War, Bennett enlisted in the Highland Light Infantry. While holding the rank of sergeant, he received a gunshot wound to the back on 15 July 1916, but survived. He later worked as a textile manufacturer and died of stomach cancer in 1955, age 64.

Career statistics

References

1891 births
1955 deaths
Scottish footballers
Scottish Football League players
British Army personnel of World War I
Highland Light Infantry soldiers
Sportspeople from Rutherglen
Association football outside forwards
Queen's Park F.C. players
British shooting survivors
Deaths from stomach cancer
Deaths from cancer in Scotland
Footballers from South Lanarkshire